Plesiococcolepis is an extinct genus of prehistoric ray-finned fish. It belongs to the family Coccolepididae and is known from the Early Jurassic of Lingling-Hengyang, Hunan, China.

See also

 Prehistoric fish
 List of prehistoric bony fish

References

Prehistoric ray-finned fish genera
Prehistoric chondrostei